Frank Bruneel is a former American politician and businessman from Idaho. Bruneel was a member of Idaho House of Representatives.

Early life 
On May 4, 1935, Bruneel was born in Boise, Idaho. Bruneel graduated from Boise High School.

Career 
Bruneel was a businessman in the tires industry. Bruneel was the founder of Bruneel Tires.

In 1994, Bruneel transferred his day-to-day operational duties at Bruneel Tires to his son Craig Bruneel.

On November 8, 1994, Bruneel won the election and became a Republican member of Idaho House of Representatives for District 6, seat A. Bruneel defeated Paul Keeton with 53.9% of the votes. On November 5, 1996, as an incumbent, Bruneel won the election and continued serving District 6, seat A. Bruneel defeated Lovetta Eisele with 57.3% of the votes. 
On November 3, 1998, as an incumbent, Bruneel won the election and continued serving District 6, seat A. Bruneel defeated Rian K. Van Leuven with 54.3% of the votes. On November 7, 2000, as an incumbent, Bruneel won the election unopposed and continued serving District 6, seat 6.

In June 2006, Bruneel was appointed as the chairman of Idaho Transportation Board.

Bruneel is a small airplane pilot. Bruneel operates his Cessna 206 aircraft.

Personal life 
Bruneel's wife is Sharon Bruneel. They have eight children. Bruneel and his family live at Lewiston, Idaho.

References 

Living people
Republican Party members of the Idaho House of Representatives
Year of birth missing (living people)